The Wizard of Stone Mountain is a 2011 fantasy-adventure fan film based upon Mattel's Masters of the Universe franchise and Faust by Johann Wolfgang von Goethe. The film was directed by John F. Carroll and Russell Minton during the summer of 2010 around Austin, Texas and the Texas Hill Country.

The film centers around the young wizard, Malik and his obsession with power. Desperate to help his ailing people, he calls upon evil forces he cannot control, ultimately selling his soul to the devil in order to save his village and win the love of his life. The film debuted at Grayskull Con 2011 in Germany during September 2011, followed by screenings at Power-Con 2011 in Los Angeles and the Alamo Drafthouse in Austin, Texas. The film is free to view online and began streaming on Halloween Night 2011.

Plot
On the planet Eternia, both the forces of good and evil struggle for the ultimate power of the universe. But for some, power is not enough. The evil Skeletor, ever plotting his conquest of Eternia turns his eye to one of the last remaining wizards of the old kingdom—Malik, The Wizard of Stone Mountain. Tucked in the sleepy village of Artana at the base of the Mystic Mountains, Skeletors' ally, Evil-Lyn summons a demon, Locus, to manipulate Malik. Tampering with magic beyond his control, Malik makes a Faustian deal with Locus to help his people and win the love of his life. It is up to the heroic Masters of the Universe to save Malik from certain doom.

Cast

John F. Carroll as Malik
Chris Romani as Evil-Lyn
LeRoy Beck as Melaktha
Nick Orzech as Stanlan
Suzanne Orzech as Stanlan's Mother
Mark Orzech as Stanlan's Father
Javier Smith as Chief Carnivas
Braden Hunt as Count Marzo
Bethany Harbaugh as Teela
Allison Wood as Brina, The Royal Healer
Jacquelyn Lies as Kesara, The Royal Healer
Candice Adams Roma as Endymia, The Royal Healer
Ron Weisberg as Fisto
Kevin Gouldthorpe as Stratos
James Ireland as the Village of Artana Merchant
Bridget Farias as Kareen
Richard Dodwell as Kyros
Joseph Fotinos as King Randor
Emily Hampton as Princess Adora
Angela Pierce as Deirdra
Parker Danks as Chad
Xaq Webb as Bradaen
Blake Yelavich as Locus
Juli Dearrington as The Sorceress
Russell Minton as Kothos
John "Sarge" Stewart as the Evergreen Forest Pilgrim
Andrew Brett as Skeletor
Elisabeth Giminiani as the daughter of Eli, a child in the village of Artana
Kile Moore as Eli, a father in the village of Artana
Laura Cannon as the wife of Eli, a mother in the village of Artana
Ben Scott as Man-At-Arms
Taylor Basinger as Malik's Servant (Giaus)
Brian Bogart as Prince Adam
Tyler Belcik as Tri-Klops

Reception
Based upon interviews in Masters Cast and forum discussion* fans have generally enjoyed and supported the film, despite some flaws in filmmaking technique.  Like many films of this type, sci-fi/horror with low/no budget, it is to be enjoyed because of (not despite) the flaws.

Sequels
The Wizard of Stone Mountain is part of a trilogy that includes The Fountain of Life and The Trials of Darksmoke. The Wizard of Stone Mountain is the first film in the trilogy.

References

External links
 
 Wizard of Stone Mountain Facebook Page
 Internet Movie Database

2011 films
Films shot in Austin, Texas
Films shot in New Braunfels, Texas
2010s English-language films
Fan films